Mohammad Akkari (born 4 December 1985 in Tripoli) is a former Lebanese basketball player who played for the Lebanese Basketball League's top division basketball club Al Mouttahed Tripoli.

Akkari joined the "basketball 100-point-game club" by scoring 113 points for first division Moutahed's game on April 3, 2012, against Bejjeh basketball team. Akkari, a guard, averages 7.6 points in 23 games, but had the game of his life against Bejjeh by making 40-of-69 shots, including 32-of-59 3-pointers. This was the first 100-point performance in an official game in any league of the FIBA Asia National Federations. The game finished 173–141 in favor of Al Mouttahed.

See also
 List of basketball players who have scored 100 points in a single game

References

1985 births
Living people
Lebanese men's basketball players
Shooting guards
Sportspeople from Tripoli, Lebanon